Amy Meredith Linker (born October 19, 1966) is an American former child actress. Her most notable role was on the 1982 television series Square Pegs, in which she co-starred as Lauren Hutchinson alongside Sarah Jessica Parker.

Career
Born in Brooklyn, New York, Linker's first major acting role was as Kelly Lewis in the television series Lewis & Clark, which ran for one season from 1981 to 1982. Shortly thereafter, Linker was cast as central character Lauren Hutchinson on the teen comedy/drama Square Pegs. Square Pegs told the story of two high school freshmen, Hutchinson and Patty Greene (played by Sarah Jessica Parker), and their at times desperate attempts to fit in and achieve popularity. Linker was forced to wear fake braces and a fatsuit in order to appear less attractive than she actually was for the character she portrayed. Even though the show was praised by critics, it was cancelled after its first season. Square Pegs creator Anne Beatts revealed the show's abrupt demise came from unfortunate circumstances behind the scenes – specifically, drug abuse among the teenage cast. Beatts revealed in 2015, "I think that certainly, there was some drug abuse or drug traffic that may have happened, because I would say that that is the norm for a set". Devo member Gerald Casale also confirmed in 2009 about the drug use on set, saying "The girls were out of control — they were doing drugs and they were making out and they were coming on to us in a big way … They might have been 15 or 16, but in their heads they were already 40. I don’t think there was a virgin on the set, except maybe a couple of the guys". Most of the show's scenes were filmed at the abandoned Excelsior High School in the suburb of Norwalk, California. Because Norwalk was twenty miles from Norman Lear's studio and CBS Television in Los Angeles, it was hard to know what was happening during filming. Embassy Television received numerous reports of drug and alcohol abuse in the presence of minors, which caused then Embassy president Michael Grade to ask for an investigation and led him to pull the plug on the show shortly after the first season finished production.
After Square Pegs, Linker voiced the character of "Robin" on the animated Mister T series in 1983. After the show ended she enrolled in Wellesley College, graduating in 1989 with a degree in French studies.

Other notable roles for Linker were as Sherie Lee Fox in the 1985 science fiction film D.A.R.Y.L., and as Jenny Pennoyer in the 1984 TV movie When We First Met. Most recently, Linker appeared as the character Esmerelda on the television series Don't Make Me Sick in 2009.

Personal life
Linker attended Beverly Hills High School in Beverly Hills, California and Frenchwoods Festival of the Performing Arts camp. Since apparently quitting acting, she has worked in Internet marketing and worked as a second grade teacher. In 2012, she obtained her Master of Social Work from the University of Southern California, and now works as an outpatient community therapist.

Filmography

References

External links

 Amy Linker on TVLand.com
TV Guide celebrity profile

1966 births
Living people
American child actresses
American television actresses
Wellesley College alumni
20th-century American actresses
21st-century American actresses
People from Brooklyn
Actresses from New York City
University of Southern California alumni